Harpalus cyclogonus is a species of ground beetle in the subfamily Harpalinae. It was described by Maximilien Chaudoir in 1844.

References

cyclogonus
Beetles described in 1844